Noir: A Collection of Crime Comics is a black-and-white crime comics anthology published by Dark Horse Comics. The collection contains original stories as well as short stories of already established crime comics series.

Stories

"Stray Bullets: Open the Goddamn Box"

Writer and artist: David Lapham

Letterer: Clem Robins

"The Old Silo"
Writer and artist: Jeff Lemire

"Mister X: Yacht on the Styx"

Writer and artist: Dean Motter

"The Last Hit"

Writer: Chris Offutt

Penciller: Kano

Inker: Stefano Gaudiano

Letterer: Clem Robins

"Fracture"

Writer: Alex De Campi

Artist: Hugo Petrus

Letterer: Ryan Hill

"The Albanian"

Writer and artist: M. K. Perker

"Kane: The Card Player"

Writer and artist: Paul Grist

"Blood on My Hands"

Writer and artist: Rick Geary

"Trustworthy"
Prose story with illustrations

Writer: Ken Lizzi

Artist: Joëlle Jones

"The New Me"

Writer: Gary D. Phillips

Artist: Eduardo Barreto

Letterer: Tom Orzechowski

"Lady's Choice"

Writers and artists: The Fillbach Brothers

"Criminal: 21st Century Noir"

Writer: Ed Brubaker

Artist: Sean Phillips

"The Bad Night"

Writer: Brian Azzarello

Artists: Gabriel Bá and Fábio Moon

References

Crime comics
Comics anthologies
Dark Horse Comics graphic novels
2009 graphic novels